Dichomeris bitinctella is a moth in the family Gelechiidae. It was described by Francis Walker in 1864. It is found on Borneo.

Adults are ferruginous, the forewings tinged with chalybeous (steel blue), most prevalent along the costa and forming a band on the exterior border.

References

Moths described in 1864
bitinctella